Gediminas Akstinas  (born 1 August 1961 in Vilnius, Lithuania) is a Lithuanian painter.

Biography
He graduated from the Pedagogical Institute of Šiauliai in 1986. Since 1994, he has at taught at the M. K. Čiurlionis Arts Gymnasium.

His works range from small ("Lentynėlė - the song" in 1990), large ("carriage" in 1998), most portable, some of the composite link to a specific location ("heave" in 1995).
The paradoxical and conceptual approach emphasizes intelligent, suddenly adapt and interpret the seemingly domestic objects; creation affects the twentieth century Western art direction (Dada, Surrealism, New Realism, etc.)

References

See also
List of Lithuanian painters

1961 births
Living people
Artists from Vilnius
Lithuanian painters
Šiauliai Pedagogical Institute alumni